Help were a 1970s psychedelic, acid, hard rock power trio from California.

The band comprised Jack Merrill (vocals, guitar), Ron Rochan (vocals, bass guitar, percussion), and Chet McCracken (vocals, drums, percussion, formerly of the Evergreen Blueshoes).

They released two albums on Decca Records in 1970 and 1971.

McCracken went on to drum with The Doobie Brothers.

Discography

Albums
 Help (1970), Decca
 Second Coming (1971), Decca

Singles
"Keep in Touch" (1971), Decca
"Good Time Music" (1971), Decca

References

Psychedelic rock music groups from California
Hard rock musical groups from California
Musical groups established in 1970
Musical groups disestablished in 1971
Decca Records artists
Musical trios